The 1989–90 Drexel Dragons men's basketball team represented Drexel University  during the 1989–90 NCAA Division I men's basketball season. The Dragons, led by 13th year head coach Eddie Burke, played their home games at the Daskalakis Athletic Center and were members of the East Coast Conference (ECC).

The team finished the season 13–15, and finished in 4th place in the ECC in the regular season.

On February 5, 1990, Todd Lehmann set the Drexel team record for most assists in a single game, recording 19 assists against Liberty.

Roster

Schedule

|-
!colspan=9 style="background:#F8B800; color:#002663;"| Regular season
|-

|-
!colspan=12 style="background:#FFC600; color:#07294D;"| ECC Tournament

Awards
Todd Lehmann
ECC All-Conference Second Team

References

Drexel Dragons men's basketball seasons
Drexel
1989 in sports in Pennsylvania
Drexel